Allalou (March 30, 1902 – February 19, 1992) was an Algerian playwright, theatre director and actor known as the father of Algerian theater.

Early life
Allalou was born Ali Sellali on March 3, 1902, in the Casbah of Algiers.

Biography
Allalou who lost his father early began at the age of thirteen to work to support his family. He successively practiced jobs as pharmacy clerk, bookseller and tramway worker. His interest in the artistic representation manifested itself early. At the age of fifteen, he began frequenting the Foyer du soldat where he played skits and sang songs (he was a visionary and eccentric comic singer), becoming accustomed to venues. He precociously became familiar with drama. He attended galas Karsenty and performances by Georges Abiad and Azzedine's Egyptian theatre companies in the early twenties. This encounter with theater gave him the idea to produce plays. He thus began to produce sketches which dealt with subjects drawn primarily from everyday life: marriage, divorce, alcoholism. These themes were also included in the plays staged after 1926. Contacts with European and especially Edmond Yafil, a great connoisseur of Algerian classical music who devoted his life to the development of this art, made him understand and appreciate music.

Allalou died on February 19, 1992, in Algiers.

Plays
Djeha (1926)
Zouadj Bou 'Akline (1926)
One Thousand and One Nights (1930, 1931)

Bibliography

References

1902 births
1992 deaths
Algerian male stage actors
People from Casbah
Algerian dramatists and playwrights
20th-century Algerian male actors
20th-century dramatists and playwrights
20th-century Algerian male singers
Male dramatists and playwrights
Algerian male writers
20th-century male writers
20th-century Algerian writers